The canton of Verdun-sur-Garonne is an administrative division of the Tarn-et-Garonne department, in southern France. At the French canton reorganisation which came into effect in March 2015, it was expanded from 9 to 13 communes. Its seat is in Verdun-sur-Garonne.

It consists of the following communes:

Aucamville 
Beaupuy
Bouillac
Campsas
Canals
Dieupentale
Fabas
Grisolles
Mas-Grenier
Pompignan
Saint-Sardos
Savenès
Verdun-sur-Garonne

References

Cantons of Tarn-et-Garonne